The 2014–15 Ohio Bobcats women's basketball team represented Ohio University during the 2014–15 NCAA Division I women's basketball season. The Bobcats, led by second year head coach Bob Boldon, played its home games at the Convocation Center in Athens, Ohio as a member of the Mid-American Conference. They finished the season 27–5 and 16–2 in MAC play. After winning the MAC regular season and beating sixth-seeded Eastern Michigan 60–44 in the MAC tournament final., the team was invited to the 2015 NCAA women's tournament and lost to Arizona State in the first round.

Preseason
The preseason coaches' poll and league awards were announced by the league office on October 29, 2014. Ohio was picked fourth in the MAC East

Preseason women's basketball coaches poll
(First place votes in parenthesis)

East Division
  (8)
  (3)
 
 Ohio (1)

West Division
  (11)
  (1)

Tournament champs
Central Michigan (10), Ball State (1), Buffalo (1)

Preseason All-MAC

Source

Roster

Schedule and results 

Source:

|-
! colspan=6 style=| non-conference regular season

|-
! colspan=6 style=| MAC regular season

|-
! colspan=6 style=| MAC Tournament

|-
! colspan=6 style=| NCAA tournament

Awards and honors

Weekly Awards

All-MAC Awards

See also 

2014–15 Ohio Bobcats men's basketball team

References 

 Ohio Bobcats Women's Basketball Roster
 Ohio History and Records
 Ohio Bobcats Women's Basketball Schedule

Ohio
Ohio Bobcats women's basketball seasons
2015 NCAA Division I women's basketball tournament participants
Ohio Bobcats women's basketball
Ohio Bobcats women's basketball